Sons and Heirs (stylized in all caps) is a 2022 New Zealand independent crime film written and directed by New Zealand filmmakers Leon Eldred and Ārana Edmonds and starring Leon Eldred, Tomás  Bale, Jackson Harbers and Ārana Edmonds. The film is a New Zealand venture produced by Small Boat, and distributed by them as well. The film is loosely based  on the Masterton electorate voted ‘no-licence’ in 1908, it chronicles the lives of the Gazebo brother's  Tony Gazebo and Ralphy Gazebo as they  rise to prominence as gangsters in the Wairarapa's world of organized crime. The film explores themes of  betrayal, loss, broken relationships, together with the rise of mobsters in New Zealand society.

The film was shot largely by Kuranui students.

Plot 
The story is set in 1947 during the Masterton prohibition and follows two Brothers; Tony Gazebo, Ralphie Gazebo and their Father; Frank Gazebo. Frank works in his general store selling the Juice he makes at home, barely making ends meet. Frank tries to take out a loan but is denied due to a pre-existing one, two gangsters (Gorilla Goon "G.G", Richard Saunders) prey upon this and tries to get him to take out an unlawful loan.
 
The gangsters meet up with Frank and he tries to back out so "G.G" simply kills him. The brothers find out so they set out to turn their remaining juice into alcohol and sell it. The brothers go to a local speakeasy to meet "Black" Sal, the kingpin of the gang and unknowingly make a deal to sell it to the gang that killed their dad. After a meeting with a politician goes wrong, the two brothers find out that the gang is responsible for the death of their father, in turn, they set out to get their revenge. When Sal makes an offer for them to make more alcohol for a gathering of two rival gangs to cherish the end of the prohibition.

Tony and Ralphie begin production of the alcohol for the gathering and dose it with poison, with intent to kill everyone at the gathering. The gathering starts and they share drinks and listen to Sal's speech, everyone begins vomiting as a result of the poison, except for Sal who doesn't drink, the brothers escape the party and end up getting hunted down at their own home, the two get shot to death by Sal's Winchester.

Cast 

Cameo appearances from David Seymour, Patrick Gower and Paul Moon who all lent their voices to the film.

Production

Development 
The film was made with financial support from South Wairarapa District Council and various other community organisations.

Pre-production 
Sons and Heirs was directed by Leon Eldred and Ārana Edmonds. Edmonds served as a producers. Music was composed by Eldred, Michael McCall and Caleb Drinnan. The crew consisted entirely of kuranui students. Edmonds create many of the film's practical effects with more than 30 litres of fake blood.

Filming 
Filming began in May 2022 and finished in October. The film was shot on location around the Wairarapa, towns like Masterton, Carterton, Greytown and Featherston. With interior scenes of the General Store at Cobblestones Museum.

Release 
The premiere was held in Masterton on 5 November. The film was released on DVD in November 2022.

See also 
 Cinema of New Zealand

Notes

References

External links 

 

Films set in New Zealand
2022 films
2020s English-language films
New Zealand independent films
Films shot in New Zealand
Great Depression films
Films set in the 1930s
Films set in the 1940s